Heterixalus luteostriatus is a species of frog in the family Hyperoliidae endemic to Madagascar. Its natural habitats are subtropical or tropical dry forests, swamps, freshwater marshes, intermittent freshwater marshes, arable land, urban areas, heavily degraded former forests, ponds, irrigated land, and seasonally flooded agricultural land.

References

Heterixalus
Endemic frogs of Madagascar
Taxonomy articles created by Polbot
Amphibians described in 1910